New Wales may refer to:
New South Wales
An early name for an area of northern Canada; see New Britain (Canada)
The Welsh Tract, a portion of the present-day U.S. state of Pennsylvania settled largely by Welsh-speaking Quakers.
A colony proposed in 1761 situated along the Mississippi River, named after George III, the then Prince of Wales and its proposed proprietor.